Aliquippa station is a former railway station located in Aliquippa, Pennsylvania, United States. The station was constructed and used by the now defunct Pittsburgh and Lake Erie Railroad.  Constructed in 1911, the station has also gone by the name of Woodlawn station because of the former town of Woodlawn that was merged with Aliquippa in the late 1870s.  After the station closed to passengers, it was used for several years by the Jones and Laughlin Steel Company as an office building.  Today, the structure sits vacant just outside the city of Aliquippa.  The station was listed on the National Register of Historic Places in 1990 as the Pittsburgh and Lake Erie Passenger Station, Aliquippa.

References

External links 
 Aliquippa's Beginnings

Railway stations on the National Register of Historic Places in Pennsylvania
Former Pittsburgh and Lake Erie Railroad stations
Railway stations in Beaver County, Pennsylvania
Railway stations in the United States opened in 1911
National Register of Historic Places in Beaver County, Pennsylvania
Aliquippa, Pennsylvania
1911 establishments in Pennsylvania
Company towns in Pennsylvania